USS Newport News (AK-3) was a cargo ship acquired by the U.S. Navy for service in World War I.

Acquiring a captured German freighter 

The first Navy ship to bear the name, Newport News was originally , a German cargo ship built in 1904 by Flensburger Schiffbau-Gesellschaft. She was taken over from the Hamburg America Line during World War I in compliance with  dated May 14, 1917.  Commissioned on July 14, 1917, the renamed Newport News entered Navy service.

World War I North Atlantic operations 
 
Newport News operated on transatlantic supply runs until assigned to NOTS 9 January 1918. Returning to Hampton Roads from Europe 2 February, she carried coal to Boston, Massachusetts, before sailing from New York 24 March laden with military supplies for England, arriving Liverpool on the 22nd. After discharging her cargo at Liverpool, Dublin, and Queenstown, she got underway for the United States 18 May, arriving Philadelphia, Pennsylvania, on the 31st.
 
In subsequent months, Newport News made three more voyages to European ports with mixed cargoes. Her last took her from New York to Gibraltar in April 1919. After unloading there, she took on food, clothing and other supplies and steamed to Constantinople to relieve famine and widespread suffering in the Middle East. Returning to Norfolk, Virginia, via Gibraltar 27 June, Newport News was detached from NOTS.

Servicing activities in the Pacific Ocean 
 
Newport News departed Hampton Roads 12 July and steamed via the Panama Canal for the Pacific Ocean, arriving Mare Island 5 August. She operated on supply runs, primarily to the Far East.

Decommissioning 

She was decommissioned at U.S. Navy Yard, Puget Sound, Washington, 1 August 1924 and struck from the Navy List the same day.  Newport News was sold 4 April 1925 to John F. Blaine of Berkeley, California, for scrapping.

Military awards and honors 

Newport News’ crew was authorized the following medal:
 World War I Victory Medal (with Transport clasp)

References

External links 
 

Ships built in Flensburg
Ships of the Hamburg America Line
1903 ships
Cargo ships of the United States Navy
World War I cargo ships of the United States